The Piute County Courthouse, located at Main St. and Center St. in Junction, Utah, was built in 1903.  It was listed on the National Register of Historic Places (NRHP) in 1971.

The building site was donated by John Morrill in 1902 (see the John and Ella Morrill House, also on Main St. and also NRHP-listed).  It was designed by architect Richard C. Watkins in Edwardian architecture style;  it was built by contractors Young, Alan & Morrill who formed its red bricks on the building site.

References

Courthouses on the National Register of Historic Places in Utah
Government buildings completed in 1903
Buildings and structures in Piute County, Utah
County courthouses in Utah
Edwardian architecture
National Register of Historic Places in Piute County, Utah